Bruceanol D is a cytotoxic quassinoid isolated from Brucea antidysenterica with potential antitumor and antileukemic properties.

See also
 Bruceanol

References

Quassinoids
Heterocyclic compounds with 5 rings
Methyl esters